Andéramboukane  is a cercle of Ménaka Region, Mali.

References 

Cercles of Mali